Weathersby is an English surname, originally given to people from Wetherby, West Yorkshire. Notable people with the surname include:

Carl Weathersby (born 1953), American blues musician
Davis Weathersby, American football coach
Dennis Weathersby (born 1980), American football player
Thomas Weathersby Sr. (born 1944), American politician
Toby Weathersby (born 1996), American football player

See also
Weatherby (disambiguation)

References